Giovanni del Sega (c. 1450 – 1527) was an Italian painter of the Renaissance.

He was a student of Melozzo da Forlì, and was active mainly in Carpi. He collaborated in the decoration, now lost, of the facade of the Palazzo del Pio.  In that palace, he also painted frescoes for the Sala dei Mori, an Annunciation.

References

1450s births
1527 deaths
15th-century Italian painters
Italian male painters
16th-century Italian painters
Italian Renaissance painters